The Saar is a river in northeastern France and western Germany, and a right tributary of the Moselle. It rises in the Vosges mountains on the border of Alsace and Lorraine and flows northwards into the Moselle near Trier. It has two headstreams (the Sarre Rouge and Sarre Blanche, which join in Lorquin), that both start near Mont Donon, the highest peak of the northern Vosges. After  (129 kilometres; 80 miles in France and on the French-German border, and 117 kilometres; 73 miles in Germany) the Saar flows into the Moselle at Konz (Rhineland-Palatinate) between Trier and the Luxembourg border.

The Saar flows through the following departments of France, states of Germany and towns:
Moselle (F): Abreschviller (Sarre Rouge), Lorquin, Sarrebourg, Fénétrange
Bas-Rhin (F): Sarre-Union
Moselle (F): Sarralbe, Sarreguemines
Saarland (D): Saarbrücken, Völklingen, Wadgassen, Bous, Saarlouis, Dillingen,  Merzig
Rhineland-Palatinate (D): Saarburg, Konz.

On the banks of the Saar is the UNESCO-World Heritage Site Völklinger Hütte. At Mettlach the Saar passes the well-known Saar loop. The lower Saar in Rhineland-Palatinate is a winegrowing region of some importance, producing mostly Riesling. Until the early 20th century, much more wine was grown on the banks of the Saar, reaching much further up from the mouth of the river, up to Saarbrücken. Only in the early 21st century have some enterprising farmers from the Saarland area started experimenting with winegrowing again.

The name Saar stems from the Celtic word sara (streaming water), and the Roman name of the river, saravus.

Tributaries
Tributaries of the Saar are, from source to mouth:

Sarre Blanche (left)
Sarre Rouge (right)
Bièvre (right)
Isch (right)
Albe (left)
Eichel (right)
Blies (right)
Rohrbach (right)
Köllerbach (right)
Rossel (left)
Bist (left)
Ellbach (right)
Prims (right)
Nied (left)
Leukbach (left)

Navigation
In 2001, the lowermost  section from the confluence of Saar and Moselle at Konz up to the city of Saarbrücken was upgraded for navigation with Class Vb ships. Since then, goods can be transported in northbound direction, for instance, to the sea port of Rotterdam. In its middle section, the Saar had been made navigable in 1866 and was used for the transport of coal (upstream) and of iron ore (downstream) in southbound direction. The  section between Saarbrücken and Sarreguemines is navigable for smaller Class I ships. At Sarreguemines the  Canal de la Sarre (also navigable for Class I ships) connects the Saar since 1866 with the Marne–Rhine Canal at Gondrexange.

References

Rivers of France
Rivers of Saarland
Rivers of Rhineland-Palatinate
 
Federal waterways in Germany
Rivers of Grand Est
Rivers of Moselle (department)
Rivers of Bas-Rhin
Rivers of Germany
France–Germany border
International rivers of Europe
Border rivers